Microbacterium neimengense is a Gram-positive, non-spore-forming, rod-shaped and non-motile bacterium from the genus Microbacterium which has been isolated from rhizosphere of a maize-plant in China.

References

External links
Type strain of Microbacterium neimengense at BacDive -  the Bacterial Diversity Metadatabase	

Bacteria described in 2013
neimengense